CKNX-FM is a Canadian radio station, which broadcasts at 101.7 FM in Wingham, Ontario. The station broadcasts a hot adult contemporary format as 101.7 The One. The station was formerly known as FM102 before summer 2006.

History
The station was launched on April 17, 1977 by Blackburn Radio, the owner of the city's existing CKNX 920 AM and former owner of CKNX-TV, which is now owned by Bell Media. Blackburn subsequently launched another FM station in Wingham, CIBU-FM, in 2005.

In 1987, CKNX Broadcasting Limited (CKNX Broadcasting) was denied a license to establish rebroadcasters of CKNX-FM Wingham at Owen Sound (50 watts on 103.7 MHz) and Meaford (80 watts on 105.5 MHz).

On August 29, 1989, the CRTC approved CKNX Broadcasting Limited application to establish a low-power rebroadcast FM transmitter in Centreville, on 104.9 MHz to serve Centreville and Meaford with 5 watts. The callsign for the FM repeater would become CKNX-FM-2. On August 28, 2008, Blackburn Radio applied to the CRTC to change the Centreville/Meaford frequency from 104.9 to 102.7 MHz and to increase power from 5 to 250 watts which was denied on December 2 later that same year.

In 2016, Blackburn submitted an application to the CRTC to delete CKNX-FM's repeater CKNX-FM-2.

References

External links
 101.7 The One
 
 

Knx
Knx
Knx
Radio stations established in 1977
1977 establishments in Ontario